Acalyptris galinae is a moth of the family Nepticulidae. It was described by Puplesis in 1984. It is known from Turkmenistan and Uzbekistan, as well as Mongolia and the United Arab Emirates.

Its habitat consists of deserts.

The wingspan 4.4–5.5 mm. Adults are on wing from April to June.

References

Nepticulidae
Moths of Asia
Moths described in 1984